"Ultraviolence" is a song recorded by American singer and songwriter Lana Del Rey for her third studio album, of the same name (2014). It was co-written by Del Rey, and Daniel Heath, and produced by Dan Auerbach. The song was released on June 4, 2014, by Polydor and Interscope Records, as the third single from Ultraviolence. A music video, directed by Francesco Carrozzini, was released on July 30, 2014.

Composition 

According to Brenna Ehrlich of MTV News, "Ultraviolence" tells the story of a "typical Lana Del Rey romantic relationship: broken, failed and painful". The song contains a reference of The Crystals’ 1962 single "He Hit Me (It Felt Like a Kiss)" in its chorus. Kevin Rutherford of Radio.com remarked that "Ultraviolence" maintained the theme of songs previously released from the album, it "ups the lilting, low-tempo, strings-heavy form" Del Rey had established in her earlier work. Sal Cinquemani of Slant Magazine described "Ultraviolence" as a "laconic, string-laden torch song". In the line "I can hear sirens sirens, he hit me and it felt like a kiss," Del Rey references the 1962 The Crystals song "He Hit Me (and It Felt like a Kiss)", and, according to Harriet Gibson of The Guardian, "appear[s] to romanticise brutality". A writer for the Music Times commented that the "violins, lightly thumping drums and Del Rey's angelic singing" gave the song a "church-y" feel, pointing out that the track presented her "title sound".

Critical response 

Nolan Feeney of Time criticized the song for its glorification of domestic violence, mentioning Lorde's comment on Del Rey's music, "This sort of shirt-tugging, desperate, don’t leave me stuff. That’s not a good thing for young girls, even young people, to hear." However, Feeney also stated that Del Rey would "likely" not endorse the "screwed-up tales of vice and luxury" her character, Lana Del Rey, sings about. While noting that Del Rey did not offer a positive or negative opinion on domestic violence, Harley Brown of Spin said that the lyrics to the song could generate controversy, especially since Del Rey dismissed feminism in a recent interview with The Fader, saying "For me, the issue of feminism is just not an interesting concept. I’m more interested in, you know, SpaceX and Tesla, what’s going to happen with our intergalactic possibilities. Whenever people bring up feminism, I’m like, god. I’m just not really that interested." By the end of 2014, NME named "Ultraviolence" the 32nd best song of the year.

Music video 
A music video, shot entirely on an iPhone on the 8mm Vintage Camera app, was released on July 30, 2014 by Noisey (Vice). It was directed by Francesco Carrozzini and filmed on July 3 in Portofino, Italy. In the video, Del Rey can be seen wearing a white wedding dress with a veil and a bouquet of flowers in her hands, wandering around an outside setting and later entering a church (Cappella di San Sebastiano).

Track listing 
Digital download
"Ultraviolence" – 4:41

Digital download (Hook N Sling Remix)
"Ultraviolence" (Hook N Sling Remix) — 5:29

Credits 
Credits adapted from the liner notes of Ultraviolence.

Performance credits

Lana Del Rey – vocals, background vocals
Alfreda McCrary Lee – background vocals
Ann McCrary – background vocals
Regina McCrary – background vocals

Instruments

Dan Auerbach – electric guitar
Collin Dupuis – drum programming
Seth Kaufman – electric guitar
Leon Michels – piano, mellotron
Nick Movshon – bass guitar
Russ Pahl – pedal steel guitar
Kenny Vaughan – electric guitar
Maximilian Weissenfeldt – drums

Technical and production

Dan Auerbach – production, mixing
John Davis – mastering
Collin Dupuis – engineering, mixing
Robert Orton – mixing

Charts

Certifications

Live performances
Del Rey premiered "Ultraviolence" as part of her set at the PNE Forum in Vancouver, British Columbia, Canada on May 25, 2014.

Release history

References

External links

"Ultraviolence" lyrics at AllMusic

2010s ballads
2014 singles
2014 songs
Interscope Records singles
Lana Del Rey songs
Rock ballads
Song recordings produced by Dan Auerbach
Songs about domestic violence
Songs written by Lana Del Rey
Torch songs